Demise is the third studio album by Missing Foundation, released in 1989 by Humanity Records.

Track listing

Personnel 
Adapted from Demise liner notes.

Missing Foundation
Mark Ashwill – instruments
Chris Egan – instruments
adam nodelman;-instruments
Florian Langmaack – instruments
Peter Missing – instruments-vocals

Production and additional personnel
Missing Foundation – production
Jim Waters – production

Release history

References

External links 
 

1989 albums
Missing Foundation albums
Restless Records albums